Willem (Wim) Cool (born 12 February 1943, Gieten) is a Dutch business consultant, mediator and politician. As a member of Democrats 66 (D66) he has been a member of the States-Provincial of North Holland since 18 April 2011.

Cool studied law at the University of Amsterdam. He was a D66 member of the municipal council of Noorder-Koggenland from 1994 to 2002 and independent alderman of the municipality of Niedorp from 2004 to 2010.

Senate election, 2011 
Cool became national news because he made a mistake during the 2011 Dutch Senate election. As a member of the North Holland States-Provincial he was entitled to vote for the new Dutch Senate on 23 May 2011 but was not able to find the red writing device (usually a pencil) prescribed for voting. Instead he voted with a blue one (his fountain pen). As a result, his vote was declared invalid and Democrats 66 missed a seat in the new Senate. His mistake was in favour of the Socialist Party (SP) which gained an extra seat. Cool regretted his mistake and apologised. Appeal of his party to the Election Council was not granted.

Personal life 
Wim Cool lives in Hauwert, which is a town in the municipality of Medemblik.

References 
  D66 North Holland biography

External links 
  North Holland States-Provincial biography

1943 births
Living people
Aldermen in North Holland
People from Niedorp
Democrats 66 politicians
Dutch civil servants
Dutch jurists
Dutch management consultants
Members of the Provincial Council of North Holland
People from Aa en Hunze
People from Noorder-Koggenland
University of Amsterdam alumni